Tom Parry is an English comedian, playwright and actor.

Career

Stand-up
Parry performed his debut solo show ‘Yellow T-shirt’ at the 2015 Edinburgh Festival Fringe.
It was nominated as the Best Newcomer at the Edinburgh Comedy Awards and earned Parry a BBC radio show. It was also nominated for Best Show at the 2016 Chortle Awards. He has appeared on the ‘Quickly Kevin, Will He Score?’ podcast with Josh Widdicombe. At the 2014 Edinburgh Festival he produced a show for ‘Beasts’ at the Pleasance Courtyard and repeated this in 2015. He was a writer on ITV's sitcom The Job Lot and several series of Great Movie Mistakes on BBC 3.

Pappy’s
He is a member of the sketch troupe Pappy's producing podcasts, television and stage shows, some of which have been nominated for awards at the Edinburgh Festival.

Film
Parry’s debut screenplay Your Christmas or Mine? was filmed at Pinewood Studios starring Asa Butterfield, Cora Kirk, Angela Griffin and Daniel Mays and available on Amazon Prime Video from 2 December, 2022.

Personal life
Originally from Wolverhampton, Parry studied English and Drama at the University of Kent. His father was a headteacher at Penn Hall school in Wolverhampton.

References

Living people
English comedians
English dramatists and playwrights
People from Wolverhampton
Alumni of the University of Kent
1980 births